Boylston is a town in Worcester County, Massachusetts, United States. The population was 4,849 at the 2020 census.

History
Boylston was first settled by Europeans around 1706 in the northern part of the present-day town, most notably by the Sawyer family. In 1697, the residents petitioned to form a local town and government, but the British colonial Governor of Massachusetts denied their request since he wanted to keep the number of towns to a minimum and to restrict popular representation.

A meeting house was built in 1743, and the Reverend Ebenezer Morse, ordained in October 1743, was the first minister in charge of the church.

The town was made up of a large part of land from Shrewsbury and the remainder from Lancaster and was known as the North Parish of Shrewsbury from 1742 until 1786, when it was incorporated as Boylston.

It was named after Ward Nicholas Boylston (1747–1828), a benefactor of the town. The fund he set up in 1797 finally accumulated $1,450, which was used to build the town hall and school building.

The locals used to live off agriculture, and erected mills on the Nashua River, until the construction of Wachusett Reservoir terminated their operation.

Geography

With a population of nearly 4400 residents, the town is predominantly a residential community.

The town of Boylston is bordered by the towns of Shrewsbury, West Boylston, Sterling, Clinton, Berlin, and Northborough.

Demographics

As of the 2000 census, there were 4,008 people, 1,573 households, and 1,140 families residing in the town. The racial makeup of the town was 96.71% White, 0.67% African American, 0.22% Native American, 1.37% Asian, 0.25% from other races, and 0.77% from two or more races. Hispanic or Latino of any race were 0.57% of the population.

There were 1,573 households, out of which 33.2% had children under the age of 18 living with them, 63.9% were married couples living together, 6.6% had a female householder with no husband present, and 27.5% were non-families. 22.3% of all households were made up of individuals, and 8.6% had someone living alone who was 65 years of age or older. The average household size was 2.55 and the average family size was 3.02.

In the town, the population was spread out, with 24.3% under the age of 18, 4.4% from 18 to 24, 31.3% from 25 to 44, 27.8% from 45 to 64, and 12.3% who were 65 years of age or older. The median age was 40 years. For every 100 females, there were 99.0 males. For every 100 females age 18 and over, there were 96.5 males.

The median income for a household in the town was $67,703, and the median income for a family was $77,604. Males had a median income of $56,019 versus $43,277 for females. The per capita income for the town was $32,274. About 2.4% of families and 2.8% of the population were below the poverty line, including 0.5% of those under age 18 and 9.8% of those age 65 or over.

Government

Library

The Boylston Public Library was established in 1880. In fiscal year 2008, the town of Boylston spent 1.35% ($152,562) of its budget on its public library—some $35 per person.

Education
Boylston currently operates a junior-senior high school with the neighboring town of Berlin, called the Tahanto Regional Middle/High School. It is part of the Berlin-Boylston Regional School District. The town is also home to the Tower Hill Botanic Garden, operated by the Worcester County Horticultural Society, which offers adult education classes in horticulture, cooking, and gardening.

The school mascot is a stag, and the teams' colors are white and green.

Notable Residents
 Kevin Manion (1972-) - NASCAR race winning crew chief

Photos

Footnotes

Further reading 

 Flagg, Charles Allcott. A Guide to Massachusetts Local History. Salem, MA: Salem Press Company, 1907. Cf.p. 225.
 Fuhrer, Mary Babson. A Crisis of Community: The Trials and Transformation of a New England Town, 1815-1848. Chapel Hill, NC: University of North Carolina Press, 2014. 
 Hastings, Gordon, " The HASTINGS of Boylston, Massachusetts. Create Space Independent Publishing Platform. 2018. 
 Hastings, Gordon, " Rocky Road To Dublin" Amazon Independent Publishing, 2018, .

External links

 Town of Boylston official website
 Boylston Historical Society and Museum
 Berlin-Boylston School District

Towns in Worcester County, Massachusetts
Towns in Massachusetts